Michael Harris (born 24 July 1989 in Exeter) is an English professional squash player. As of February 2018, he was ranked number 190 in the world.

References

1989 births
Living people
English male squash players